This is a bibliography of works about the Romanian Revolution.

The Romanian Revolution was a series of riots and clashes in December 1989. These were part of the Revolutions of 1989 that occurred in several Warsaw Pact countries. The Romanian Revolution was the only one of these revolutions where a Communist government was violently overthrown and the country's leader was executed.

In Romanian
***, Însemnări din zilele revoluţiei. Decembrie '89, Bucharest, 1990
***, România 16-22 decembrie. Sînge, durere, speranţă, Bucharest, 1990
***, Televiziunea Română, Revoluţia română în direct, Bucharest, 1990
***, Timişoara 16-22 decembrie 1989, Timişoara, 1990
***, Vom muri şi vom fi liberi, Bucharest, 1990
***, Revoluţia română văzută de ziarişti americani şi englezi, Bucharest, 1991
***, O enigmă care împlineşte 7 ani, Bucharest, 1997
***, E un început în tot sfîrşitul, Bucharest, 1998
***, Atunci ne-am mântuit de frică (photo album), Timişoara, 1999
***, Decembrie 89 în presa italiană, Bucharest 1999
***, Iaşi, 14 decembrie 1989, începutul revoluţiei române?, Oradea, 2000
***, Întrebări cu şi fără răspuns, Timişoara, 2001
Vartan Arachelian, Revoluţia şi personajele sale, Bucharest, 1998
Georgeta Crăciun, Iaşi - Revoluţie şi contrarevoluţie, Iaşi, 2005
Mihai Babiţchi, Revoltă în labirint, Alba Iulia, 1995
Angela Băcescu, România '89. Din nou în calea năvălirilor barbare, Bucharest, 1995
Veronica Balaj, Jurnal de Timişoara. 16-22 decembrie 1989, Timişoara, 1991
Costel Balint,
1989. Timişoara în decembrie, Timişoara, 1992
Lumină şi speranţă. Timişoara 1989, Timişoara, 1994
1989 - Legiunea revoluţiei, Timişoara, 2005
Elena Băncilă, Trage, laşule!, Bucharest, 1990
Matei Barbu, Cap de afiş: Revoluţia de la Timişoara, Timişoara, 1999
Mariana Cernicova, Noi suntem poporul, Timişoara, 2004
Ruxandra Cesereanu, Decembrie '89. Deconstrucţia unei revoluţii, Iaşi, 2004
Radu Ciobotea, După revoluţie, târziu, Timişoara, 1995
Ion Coman,
Timişoara. Zece ani de la sîngerosul decembrie 1989, Bucharest, Sylvi Publishing House, 2000
Omul se duce, faptele rămân, istoria însă le va analiza, Bucharest, Meditaţii Publishing House, 2007
Pavel Coruţ, Să te naşti sub steaua noastră!, Bucharest, 1993
Iosif Costinaş, M-am întors, Timişoara, 2003
Teodor Crişan, Decembrie '89. Revoluţie sau lovitură de palat, Arad, 2000
Romulus Cristea,
Revoluţia 1989, Editura România pur şi simplu, Bucharest 2006
Mărturii de la baricadă, Editura România pur şi simplu, Bucharest 2007
Nicolae Danciu-Petniceanu, Tot ce am pe suflet, Baia Mare, 1995
Mihail Decean, Mărturiile unui naiv corigibil sau Singur printre securişti, Timişoara, 2006
Viorel Domenico, Ceauşescu la Târgovişte, 22-25 decembrie 1989, Bucharest, 1999
Tit Liviu Domşa, Împuşcaţi-i, că nu-s oameni!, Cluj-Napoca, 1998–1999
Petru Dugulescu, Ei mi-au programat moartea, Timişoara, 2003
Nicolae Durac, Neliniştea generalilor, Timişoara, 1990
Victor Frunză, Revoluţia împuşcată sau PCR după 22 decembrie 1989, Bucharest, 1994
Ion Iliescu,
Revoluţie şi reformă, Bucharest, 1993; revised edition, 1994
Revoluţia trăită, Bucharest, 1995
Momente de istorie, Bucharest, 1995
Petru Ilieşu, Timişoara 1989 - No Comment?, Timişoara, Planetarium, 2004
Institutul Revoluţiei,
Caietele revoluţiei, Bucharest, 1/2005; 2/2005; 1/2006; 2/2006; 3/2006; 4/2006; 5/2006; 1/2007; 2/2007
Clio 1989, Bucharest 2005
Cicerone Ioniţoiu, Album al eroilor decembrie 1989, Sibiu, 1998
Sabin Ivan, Pe urmele adevărului, Constanţa, 1996
Eugenia Laszlo, Timişoara, atunci, Timişoara, 1998
Dorian Marcu, Moartea Ceauşeştilor, Bucharest, 1991
Dumitru Mazilu, Revoluţia furată, Bucharest, 1991
Florin Medeleţ, O cronică a revoluţiei din Timişoara 16-22 decembrie 1989, Timişoara, 1990
Miodrag Milin,
Timişoara 15-21 decembrie '89, Timişoara, 1990 part 1, part 2, part 3, part 4
Timişoara în revoluţie şi după, Timişoara, 1997
Timişoara în arhivele Europei Libere, Bucharest, 1999
Marius Mioc,
Falsificatorii istoriei, Timişoara 1994; second revised edition, 1995
Revoluţia din Timişoara aşa cum a fost, Timişoara, 1997
Revoluţia din Timişoara şi falsificatorii istoriei, Timişoara, 1999
Revoluţia, fără mistere. Începutul revoluţiei române: cazul Laszlo Tokes, Timişoara, 2002
Curtea Supremă de Justiţie - Procesele revoluţiei din Timişoara (1989), Timişoara, 2004
Revoluţia din 1989 şi minciunile din Jurnalul Naţional, Timişoara, 2005
Revoluţia din 1989 pe scurt, Timişoara, 2006
Bogdan Murgescu (coordinator), Revoluţia română din 1989. Istorie şi memorie, Polirom, Iaşi, 2007
Costel Neacşu, Religiozitatea revoluţiei române din decembrie 1989, Alba Iulia, 2007
Sergiu Nicolaescu,
Revoluţia. Începutul adevărului, Bucharest, 1995
Cartea revoluţiei române decembrie '89, Bucharest, 1999
Aurel Perva, Carol Roman,
Misterele revoluţiei române, Bucharest, 1990
Misterele revoluţiei române - revenire după ani, Bucharest, 1998
Ion Pitulescu,
Şase zile care au zguduit România, Bucharest, 1995
Anul nou se naşte în sânge!, Bucharest, 1998
Vasile Popa, Procesul de la Timişoara, Timişoara, 1990
Rodica Popescu, Miracol? Revoluţie? Lovitură de stat?, Bucharest, 1990
Radu Portocală, România. Autopsia unei lovituri de stat, Bucharest, 1991
Dumitru Preda, 1989. Principiul dominoului, Bucharest, 2000
Antonina Radoş, Complotul securităţii. Revoluţia trădată din România, Bucharest, 1999
Valentin Raiha, KGB a aruncat în aer România cu complicitatea unui grup de militari, 	Bucharest, 1995
Nestor Rateş, România: Revoluţia încâlcită, Bucharest, 1995
Şerban Săndulescu, Decembrie '89. Lovitura de stat a confiscat revoluţie română, Bucharest, 1996
Alexandru Saucă, KGB-ul şi revoluţia română, Bucharest, 1994
Constantin Sava, Constantin Monac,
Adevăr despre decembrie 1989, Bucharest, 1999
Revoluţia română din decembrie 1989 retrăită prin documente şi mărturii, Bucharest, 2001
Ioan Scurtu,
Sfîrşitul dictaturii, Bucharest, 1990
Revoluţia din decembrie 1989 în context internaţional, Bucharest, 2006
Cassian Maria Spiridon, Iaşi 14 decembrie 1989, începutul revoluţiei române, Iaşi, 1994
Alex Mihai Stoenescu,
Interviuri despre revoluţie, Bucharest, 2004
Istoria loviturilor de stat din România, vol. 4 (I): "Revoluţia din decembrie 1989 - o tragedie românească", Bucharest, 2004
Istoria loviturilor de stat din România, vol. 4 (II): "Revoluţia din decembrie 1989 - o tragedie românească", Bucharest, 2005
Ilie Stoian, Decembrie '89 "criminala capodoperă", Bucharest, 1998
Nicolae Stroescu, Pe urmele revoluţiei, Bucharest, 1992
Titus Suciu,
Reportaj cu sufletul la gură, Timişoara, 1990
Lumea bună a balconului, Timişoara, 1995
Ion Ţârlea, Moartea pândeşte sub epoleţi. Sibiu '89, Bucharest, 1993
Filip Teodorescu, Un risc asumat, Bucharest, 1992
Radu Tinu, Timişoara... no comment!, Bucharest, 1999
László Tőkés, Asediul Timişoarei, Oradea, 1999
Tiberiu Urdăreanu, 1989 - martor şi participant, Bucharest, 1996

In French
Radu Portocală, Autopsie du coup d'État roumain, Calmann-Lévy, Paris, 1990

In English
Sorin Antohi, Vladimir Tismăneanu, Between Past and Future: The Revolutions of 1989 and Their Aftermath, Central European University Press, Budapest, 2000
Ivo Banac (ed.), Eastern Europe in Revolution: Katherine Verdery, Gail Klingman, "Romania After Ceausescu: Post-communist Communism", Cornell University Press, Ithaca, 1992 
Andrei Codrescu, The Hole in the Flag: A Romanian Exile's Story of Return and Revolution, William Morrow and Co., New York City, 1991 
Marius Mioc, The Anticommunist Romanian Revolution of 1989, Editura Marineasa, Timişoara, 2002; second edition 2004
Steven D. Roper, Romania: The Unfinished Revolution, Routledge, London, 2000 
Peter Siani-Davies, The Romanian Revolution of December 1989, Cornell University Press, Ithaca, 2005 
George Galloway and Bob Wylie, Downfall: The Ceausescus and the Romanian Revolution, Futura Publications, 1991 
Petru Ilieşu, Timişoara 1989 - No Comment?, Timişoara, Planetarium, 2004
Mark Almond. The Rise and Fall of Nicolae and Elena Ceausescu. KRK: Orion, 1991.
Nestor Ratesh. Romania: The Entangled Revolution (The Washington Papers). Westport, Connecticut: Praeger Paperback, 1991.
Lazlo Tokes. With God for the People: The Autobiography of ... As Told to David Porter (Teach Yourself). Port Jervis: Lubrecht & Cramer Ltd, 1990.
Bel Mooney. "Voices of Silence, the". Bantam Doubleday Dell Books for Young Readers, 1997. 
Lehel Vandor. "Ears", LegendPress & YouWriteOn, 2008 (first edition), 2014 (revised updated edition),

In German
Anneli Ute Gabanyi, Die unvollendete Revolution: Rumänien zwischen Diktatur und Demokratie, Piper Verlag, Munich, 1990

In Hungarian
József Gazda, Megváltó karácsony, Budapest, 1990
László Tőkés,
Temesvár ostroma '89, Budapest, 1990
Temesvári memento, Oradea, 1999

Multilingual
István Tolnay,	1989-1999. După zece ani. Tíz év múltán. Ten years after, Oradea, 1999 (Romanian-Hungarian-English)

See also
List of films about the Romanian Revolution of 1989

Bibliographies of wars and conflicts
Books about revolutions
Books about the Cold War
Books